Derakht-e Bid-e Sofla (also Romanized as Derakht-e Bīd-e Soflá; also known as Derakht-e Bīd-e Pā’īn) is a village in Golbibi Rural District, Marzdaran District, Sarakhs County, Razavi Khorasan Province, Iran. At the 2006 census, its population was 67, in 19 families.

References 

Populated places in Sarakhs County